is a song recorded by Japanese-American singer Hikaru Utada. It was released via Epic Records Japan and Sony Music Japan on November 26, 2021, as one of the several singles for her eighth Japanese studio-album Bad Mode (2022). The track serves as the main theme for the TBS Friday night drama Saiai. It's co-produced by Utada and the British music producer A. G. Cook.

Critical reception 
"Kimi ni Muchū" was well received by music critics. Music critic Koremasa Uno pointed out the similarities between "Kimi ni Muchū" and Utada's 2008 track "Stay Gold" in the prelude and chord progression. Nanami Ikusa of Numero Tokyo praised the track's production and said "this is a sound that can only be produced by Hikaru Utada among Japanese artists today." Reio Fujii on an InterFM radio program said: "When I first listened to it, I really enjoyed listening to the simplicity of the arrangement. I'm attracted to it. Because it's simple, her singing voice resonates very much.

Promotion 

The music video for "Kimi ni Muchū" premiered on YouTube on December 9, 2021, the 23rd anniversary of her debut in Japan. The video uses part of the performance and behind-the-scenes clips from her online concert "Hikaru Utada Live Sessions from Air Studios" in London, England, which was made available on the release day of Bad Mode on January 19, 2022.

Track listing  
Digital download / streaming

  — 5:54

Credits and personnel 
Credits adapted from an E-ontokyo press release.

 Hikaru Utada – songwriting, production, full vocals, keyboards and programming, vocal recording
 A. G. Cook – production, programming
 Steve Fitzmaurice – mixing (at Pierce House, London)
 Yuya Saito – vocal track editor (at ABS Recording, Tokyo)
 Jody Millina – bass synth

Charts

Weekly charts

Year-end charts

Sales and certifications

References

2021 singles
Hikaru Utada songs
Songs written by Hikaru Utada
2021 songs